The 2018 Asian Games torch relay preceded with a torch lighting ceremony on 15 July 2018 at the Major Dhyan Chand National Stadium in New Delhi, host of the first Asian Games. The flame was generated from a parabolic mirror directed straight at the sun. 

It was organized by Detail Communication Creative Agency who responsible for safekeeping, handling ceremonies and relay for the event itself from India through all the locations in Indonesia.

On 18 July 2018, a ceremony took place in Brahma field by the 9th century Hindu temple of Prambanan near Yogyakarta, where the torch's flame from India were fused together with an Indonesian natural eternal flame taken from Mrapen, Central Java. Subsequently, a concert was performed marking the start of torch relay throughout the country.

The relay finished on 15 August in Jakarta. In 17 August during the independence day of Indonesia the flame was stored in the National Monument, before being carried into the opening ceremony at Gelora Bung Karno Stadium on 18 August.

Route in Indonesia

References

See also
 2018 Asian Para Games#Torch relay

2018 Asian Games
Asian Games torch relays